George Figgs  (born 1947, Baltimore, Maryland) is an American actor and projectionist. He began his career portraying 
characters in the early films of John Waters. Because of his work with Waters, he is considered one of the Dreamlanders, Waters' ensemble of regular cast and crew members.

Figgs is a film historian interested in film noir and independent films. From 1991 to 1999 Figgs was the owner/operator of the Orpheum Cinema in the Fell's Point section of Baltimore.

Filmography

Film roles
Mondo Trasho (1969) as Asylum Inmate/Man in Waiting Room
Multiple Maniacs (1970) as Jesus Christ
Pink Flamingos (1972) as Bongo player
Female Trouble (1974) as Dribbles
Desperate Living (1977) as Herbert
Polyester (1981) as Abortion Picketer
Divine Trash (1998) as himself
A Dirty Shame (2004)  as Neuter (uncredited)
I Am Divine (2013) as himself

Crew
Serial Mom (1994) (projectionist)
Major League II (1994) (projectionist)
Twelve Monkeys (1995) (projectionist: Baltimore)
Home for the Holidays (1995) (projectionist) (uncredited)
Boys (1996) (projectionist)
Pecker (1998) (dailies projectionist) (uncredited)
Cecil B. DeMented (2000) (projectionist)

References

External links

1947 births
Living people